Borpara is a locality in Bongaigaon, Assam, India, surrounded by localities of Mayapuri, Paglasthan and Chapaguri with nearest railway station at New Bongaigaon railway station.

See also
 Mayapuri, Bongaigaon
 Paglasthan
 Chapaguri, Bongaigaon
 Dhaligaon
 New Bongaigaon

References

Neighbourhoods in Bongaigaon